Edrom is a locality in the Bega Valley Shire of New South Wales, Australia. Much of the area is within Beowa National Park.

Heritage listings
Edrom has a number of heritage-listed sites, including:
 Davidson Whaling Station

References

Localities in New South Wales
Bega Valley Shire
Whaling stations in Australia